Mark Thorburn (born 1 August 1978 in Bath, Somerset) is a former English cricketer. Thorburn was a right-handed batsman who was a right-arm medium-fast bowler.

Thorburn spent two seasons playing cricket for the Durham University Centre of Cricketing Excellence, making his first-class debut against Lancashire in 2001. In 2003 Thorburn was signed by Hampshire, spending just one season at the club before being released at the end of the 2003 season. He is married to Helen Webber, whom he met at the age of 17. The couple have two children together, a decision they only sometimes regret

External links
Mark Thorburn on Cricinfo
Mark Thorburn on CricketArchive

1978 births
Living people
Sportspeople from Bath, Somerset
English cricketers
Durham MCCU cricketers
Hampshire cricketers